During the 2019–20 season, Excelsior Rotterdam participated in the Eerste Divisie and the KNVB Cup. Due to the COVID-19 pandemic, the Eredivisie season was abandoned with SBV Excelsior in 7th place. They were knocked out in the second round of the KNVB Cup, losing at home to FC Eindhoven.

Competitions

Eerste Divisie

League table

KNVB Cup

Player Transfers

Players In

Players Out

Player statistics

Appearances and goals

References

SBV Excelsior
Excelsior Rotterdam